Syagrus puncticollis is a species of leaf beetle. It is distributed in Mozambique, the Democratic Republic of the Congo, Guinea and Sudan. It was first described by the German entomologist Edgar von Harold in 1877. Host plants for the species include Erythrophleum guineense.

References

Eumolpinae
Beetles of the Democratic Republic of the Congo
Insects of West Africa
Insects of Mozambique
Insects of Sudan
Beetles described in 1877
Taxa named by Edgar von Harold